Peter Williams (1915–2003) was an American-born British film, theatre and television actor. He is best known for his role as private detective Don Carter in the long-running British crime series Shadow Squad in the late 1950s. He was married to Helen "Toto" Irving, and had two children.

Selected filmography

Film
 Brass Monkey (1948)
 Bless 'Em All (1948)
 The Straw Man (1953)
 Footsteps in the Fog (1955)
 The Ladykillers (1955)
 Richard III (1955)
 Private's Progress (1956)
 The Man Who Never Was (1956)
 The Man Who Knew Too Much (1956)
 The Bridge on the River Kwai (1957)
 Dunkirk (1958)
 On the Beach (1959)
 Two Letter Alibi (1962)

Television
 Strange Experiences (1955–56)
 Shadow Squad (1957)
 Ivanhoe (1958)
 Pathfinders in Space (1960)
 Barnaby Rudge (1960)
 City Beneath the Sea (1962)
 The Human Jungle (1963)
 Gideon's Way (1965)
 Redcap (1966)
 Man in a Suitcase (1968)
 The Champions (1968)
 The Main Chance (1970)
 Pretenders (1972)
 I, Claudius (1976)

Selected stage work 
 Daphne Laureola - Old Vic & Broadway (1949 & 1950)
 Henry V - Stratford (1951)

References

Bibliography 
 Paul Cornell, Martin Day & Keith Topping. The Guinness Book of Classic British TV. Guinness, 1996.
 Bernard Sendall. Independent Television in Britain: Origin and foundation, 1946-62. Macmillan, 1982.

External links 
 
 

1915 births
2003 deaths
American male stage actors
American male film actors
British male film actors
American male television actors
British male television actors
People from New Orleans
American emigrants to the United Kingdom